Nordic Global Airlines Oy was a Finnish cargo airline which existed 2011–2015, and was based at Helsinki Airport.

History
Nordic Global Airlines was founded in April 2011 and commenced operations in August later that year. It was owned by Finnair (40%), Daken Capital Partners (29%), Neff Capital Management (20%) and Ilmarinen Mutual Insurance Company (11%).

In May 2015, it was announced that Nordic Global Airlines would cease operations by the end of May 2015 "due to economic considerations regarding the competitive market".

Destinations
As of May 2015, Nordic Global Airlines provided scheduled freighter flights from Helsinki to Brussels, New York JFK, Hanoi and Hong Kong (via Novosibirsk) and also operated ACMI and charter services to several destinations throughout Europe and Africa, such as Frankfurt and Nairobi.

Fleet 

As of May 2015, the Nordic Global Airlines fleet consisted of the following cargo aircraft:

References

External links 

 

Airlines established in 2011
Airlines disestablished in 2015
Defunct airlines of Finland
2015 disestablishments in Finland
Finnish companies established in 2011